Ełk (former ; ; Old Prussian: Luks), also spelled Elk in English, is a small city in northeastern Poland with 61,677 inhabitants as of December 2021. It was assigned to Warmian-Masurian Voivodeship in 1999, after belonging to Suwałki Voivodeship from 1975 to 1998. Ełk is the seat of Ełk County. It lies on the shore of Ełk Lake, which was formed by a glacier, and is surrounded by extensive forests. It is the largest city and unofficial capital of historical Masuria. One of the principal attractions in the area is legal hunting.

History

Middle Ages

The area where the town of Ełk is located was originally inhabited by Jatvingians, a Baltic peoples, during the early middle ages. By 1281, Skomand (Lithuanian: Skalmantas) the last leader of the pagan Jatvingians, capitulated to the crusading Teutonic Knights, who initially were invited in 1226 by Konrad I of Masovia from the Polish Piast dynasty to put an end to the constant pagan raids into his territory. 

After 1323, the northern part of the region was administered by the Komturship of Brandenburg, while the larger part with the later town belonged to Komturship Balga. A former Old Prussian settlement, the town was first documented in 1398 around a castle built by the Teutonic Knights. The town's name has various postulated origins. Its German version Lyck is postulated to be derived from its Old Prussian name, Luks (from the word for waterlily, luka), while another theory holds that the name comes from Polish word "łęg" meaning meadow. It received its town rights in 1445.

After the outbreak of the Thirteen Years' War in 1454, the town sided with the Prussian Confederation, at whose request the Polish King Casimir IV Jagiellon announced the incorporation of the region into the Kingdom of Poland, which resulted in Lyck becoming part of the Polish state. The town was briefly captured by the Teutonic Knights in 1455, and later on, it was conquered alternately by the Poles and the Teutonic Knights. After 1466 it came under Polish suzerainty as a fief.

Early modern era
In 1537, Duke Albert of Prussia donated an estate to Jan Malecki, a Polish printer from Kraków who had either fled or moved to Ducal Prussia for material reasons, to establish a printing house. After converting to Lutheranism, Malecki translated and published Martin Luther's
Small Catechism in Polish In 1546 the first school for secondary education in Masuria was founded in the city, where Polish nobles from the Polish–Lithuanian Commonwealth, as well as Poles and Germans from Ducal Prussia were taught in Polish; the position of a Polish teacher remained in place until 1819. Polish pastor, translator, publisher and co-creator of the literary Polish language, Hieronim Malecki, was the school's first rector. In the mid-16th century Lyck was one of the most thriving centers of Polish-language printing. In 1639 the King of Poland Władysław IV Vasa visited the town. It remained under Polish suzerainty until 1660.

18th and 19th centuries
In 1709-10, the plague claimed 1,300 victims. In 1831, 300 people, about 10 percent of the populace, died of the cholera, in 1837 another 80 and 333 in 1852.

In 1825, Lyck was inhabited by 1,748 Germans and 1,394 Poles.  At the beginning of the 19th century, a Polish-language school was organised in the city by Tymoteusz Gizewiusz In 1820, Fryderyk Tymoteusz Krieger became the superintendent of the school and actively defended the rights of local Poles to use the Polish language. Kireger also prepared Polish educational programs, in opposition to attempts at Germanization by Prussian authorities.

In 1840, the German-language newspaper "Lycker gemeinnütziges Unterhaltungsblatt", later called "Lycker Zeitung", was founded. Between 1842 and 1845, a Masurian newspaper "Przyjaciel Ludu Łecki" (Łek's Friend of the People) was printed in the city, whose aim was to resist Germanisation and cultivate Polish folk traditions as well as educate the local rural population.

In May 1845, a Polish resistance movement in the city was organized by Kazmierz Szulc, whose aim was to prepare local Polish youth for an uprising.

In 1885 Lyck was named capital of Masuria by the Geographical Dictionary of the Kingdom of Poland. In the late 19th century it was the largest town of the region (according to data from 1880 and 1890), before being surpassed by Osterode (Ostróda) (according to data from 1905 and 1925).

From 1896 to 1902, "Gazeta Ludowa", a Polish-language newspaper, heavily subsidised by banks from Greater Poland representing the Polish national movement in Masuria, was published in the city. It soon faced repression and discrimination from the German authorities which led to its demise; its paid circulation dropped from 357 copies in 1896 to less than 250 at the turn-of-the-century. According to German-American author, Richard Blanke, the "demise marked the end of the second major effort by Polish nationalists to establish a journalistic foothold in Masuria".

In 1896, Polish and Masurian activists founded the Masurian People's Party in the city, which sought to resist efforts of German authorities at forced Germanization. The co-founder of the party was poet Michał Kajka, today honoured in Ełk with a monument in the centre of the city. From the start, the party was subject to severe repressions and attacks by Prussian authorities. In the German federal elections, the MPL received 229 votes in 1898 and 20 in 1912 in the Lyck constituency.

20th century

In 1910, Lyck had more than 13,000 inhabitants. Mateusz Siuchniński gives the percentage of Poles in 1900 as 35.7% but warns that the numbers come from lowered German estimates. Many citizens fled during World War I, when Imperial Russian troops attacked the region, but returned after the battles of Tannenberg and the Masurian Lakes. English and Italian troops were deployed in the town after the Treaty of Versailles to supervise the East Prussian plebiscite, which resulted in 8,339 votes for Germany and 8 for Poland.

It was in Lyck that the first-ever weekly newspaper in the Hebrew language, Ha-Magid ("the preacher") was founded in 1856 by Eliezer Lipmann Silbermann, a local rabbi. The paper was eventually moved to Berlin. In Weimar Germany anti-Semitism became prevalent, which led to persecution of the local Jewish population even before the Nazis took power. An anti-Semitic publication, Die jüdische Überlegenheit (The Jewish Supremacy) attacking the Jews circulated in 1927 at a local gathering of fascist sympathizers In 1932, the local pharmacist Leo Frankenstein was attacked; a hand grenade was thrown into his home. The wave of anti-Semitic repressions intensified after Nazis gained power in Germany in 1933 and many local merchants and intellectuals of Jewish descent were arrested. During Kristallnacht, Jewish shops and synagogue were plundered and devastated in the town. Facing these events, several Jews of Lyck decided to escape, some abroad, some to Berlin, others as far as Shanghai Of those Jews who remained, 80 were murdered in various Nazi concentration and death camps.

The city also was the site of German prison camps for Norwegian and Soviet PoWs during World War II. It was heavily damaged by bombardments. 

The county of Lyck had 53,000 inhabitants when the Soviet Army approached in January 1945. The town was placed under Polish administration in April 1945 and its German inhabitants were dispossessed and forcibly expelled. It was rebuilt and renamed Ełk (before 1939, Polish names for the town included Łek, Łęg and Łęk).

Contemporary times

In 1999, Ełk was visited by Pope John Paul II. About 300,000 people attended a papal Mass.

In 2017, the anti-Muslim Ełk riots occurred. Several hundred men surrounded the Prince Kebab restaurant, tossing firecrackers, stones, and Molotov cocktails at the shop. Police initially stood by and did not intervene for several hours; however, when they did intervene the crowd turned against them as well. Following the riots in Ełk, other attacks on kebab restaurants took place throughout Poland.

In 2018, on the occasion of the 100th anniversary of Poland's independence, a monument to Józef Piłsudski was erected in front of the town hall. The Marshal of Poland was also honored with a mural on one of the townhouses in the city center.

Population

Number of inhabitants by year

Note that the above table is based on primary, possibly biased, sources:

Demographic changes

Districts

The city of Ełk is divided into 13 administrative units, known in Polish as osiedla:

 Baranki
 Centrum
 Jeziorna
 Konieczki
 Osiedle Bogdanowicza
 Osiedle Grunwaldzkie
 Osiedle Kochanowskiego
 Osiedle Tuwima
 Osiedle Wczasowe
 Pod Lasem
 Północ I
 Północ II
 Szyba
 Zatorze

Notable people
 Arthur Ludwich (1840–1920) a German classical philologist who specialized in Homeric studies
 Charles Edward Moldenke (1860–1935) was an American Lutheran minister and Egyptologist
 Theodor Simon Flatau (1860–1937), German physician
 Karol Bahrke (1868–1935), Polish activist, journalist and book publisher
 Otto von Schrader (1888–1945), German admiral
 Theodor Horydczak (1889–1971), American photographer
 Alfred Müller (1905–1959) a German middle-distance runner, competed in the 1928 Summer Olympics
 Kurt Symanzik (1923–1983), German physicist
 Siegfried Lenz (1926–2014), German author, born in Lyck; honorary citizen of Ełk since  2011.
 Klaus Gerwien (born 1940), German soccer player
 Leszek Błażyński (1949–1992), Polish boxer
 Roman Czepe (born 1956), Polish politician
 Andrzej Zgutczyński (born 1958), Polish footballer
 Dariusz Zgutczyński (born 1965), Polish footballer
 Cezary Zamana (born 1967), Polish cyclist
 Paweł Sobolewski (born 1979), Polish footballer
 Tomasz Abramowicz (born 1979), Polish footballer

Mayors
 Adam Puza (1990–1994)
 Zdzisław Fadrowski (1994–2002)
 Janusz Nowakowski (2002–2006)
 Tomasz Andrukiewicz (since 2006)

Education

 Private Economic Academy
 Nursery School
 Higher Catholic Seminary

High schools

 Zespół Szkół Ekonomicznych
 Zespół Szkół Mechaniczno - Elektrycznych
 Zespół Szkół nr 1
 Zespół Szkół nr 2 im. K. K. Baczyńskiego (swww)
 Zespół Szkół nr 3 im. J. H. Małeckich (www)
 I Liceum Ogólnokształcące im. S. Żeromskiego (www)
 Zespół Szkół Rolniczych im. M. Rataja
 Zespół Szkół Samorządowych
 Zespół Szkół nr.6 im. M. Rataja (www)

Religion

Before World War II, the town and its surroundings were almost entirely (>95%) Lutheran. After the German populace fled or was expelled, the main religion in Ełk became Roman Catholicism, although a number of Protestant churches are also represented and play an important role in the religious life of the population. These include the Methodist, Baptist, Pentecostal (Assemblies of God - Kościół Zielonoświątkowy) and other churches. Ełk is the center of the Catholic Diocese of Ełk with its bishop Jerzy Mazur.

International relations

Twin towns and sister cities
Ełk is twinned with:

  Galatone, Italy
  Lørenskog, Norway
  Nettetal, Germany
  Alytus, Lithuania
  Orbassano, Italy

Former twin towns:
  Ozyorsk, Russian Federation
  Lida, Belarus

In March 2022, Ełk ended its partnership with the Russian city of Ozyorsk as a reaction to the 2022 Russian invasion of Ukraine.

Coat of arms

The current coat of arms of Ełk were adopted in 1999, after the town was visited by the Pope John Paul II. The colors have been changed (from green to yellow), the deer is different than in the former emblem. Lastly is the addition of the insignia of the Papacy.

Until 1967, a different emblem with the two-faced head of the god Janus was used, but its origin is unknown.

Gallery

References

External links

 Municipal website 
 Ełk information 
 Jewish community of Ełk on Virtual Shtetl
 Historical postcards from Lyck (Ełk)
 Google satellite photo

 
Populated places established in the 14th century
Cities and towns in Warmian-Masurian Voivodeship
Holocaust locations in Poland